Yuen Long Theatre is a performing arts venue situated at Yuen Long Tai Yuk Road in Yuen Long, New Territories, Hong Kong. It was opened on 14 May 2000.

Facilities
The Theatre houses a 919-seat auditorium, a 180m2 dance studio, a 192m2 rehearsal room, a 117m2 lecture room, a 136m2 function room and a 120m2 exhibition corner.

Auditorium
The main performance venue seats 919. Equipped with sound and lighting systems and many other theatrical facilities, which include 24 remote-controlled motorised drapes, a flying system which comprises more than a hundred of motorised and manual cross stage hoists, an adjustable forestage, 2-in-1 convertible orchestra shell with a film projection screen, it is suitable for a variety of programmes.

External links

Official website

Music venues in Hong Kong
Indoor arenas in Hong Kong
Theatres in Hong Kong
Yuen Long